Oi Chun is one of the 25 constituencies in the Kowloon City District of Hong Kong which was created in 1994.

The constituency has an estimated population of 13,113.

Councillors represented

Election results

2010s

References

Ho Man Tin
Constituencies of Hong Kong
Constituencies of Kowloon City District Council
1994 establishments in Hong Kong
Constituencies established in 1994